WJLU is a Christian radio station broadcasting on 89.7 FM, licensed to New Smyrna Beach, Florida, and serving Daytona Beach, Florida, New Smyrna Beach, Florida, and Deltona, Florida. The station's format consists of Christian contemporary music and Christian talk and teaching.  WJLU's programming is also heard on sister station WJLH 90.3 in Flagler Beach, Florida, and is heard locally on translators in Daytona Beach, Florida, DeLand, Florida, and Deltona, Florida. The station began broadcasting on October 7, 1989, and had an ERP of 1,000 watts at 200 feet.

History
The station began broadcasting October 7, 1989, and had an ERP of 1,000 watts at 200 feet. In 1991, the station's ERP was increased to 5,000 watts at a height of 300 feet, and in 1994 its ERP was increased to 10,000 watts.  WJLH 90.3 in Flagler Beach, Florida began broadcasting August 23, 1996. On September 18, 1998, the station's translator at 97.3 in DeLand was launched and on February 23, 1999, its translator at 97.3 in Daytona Beach began broadcasting. In August 2005, the station's translator at 102.7 in Deltona began broadcasting. In 2010, WJLH's power was increased from 2,000 watts to 15,000 watts.

Translators

References

External links 
WJLU's website

JLU
Radio stations established in 1989
1989 establishments in Florida